Musashi, is a motor yacht built in 2011 by Feadship and is owned by American billionaire Larry Ellison. Musashi is named after the Japanese samurai Miyamoto Musashi.

Design
Musashi'''s exterior was designed by De Voogt Naval Architects and her interior by Sinot Exclusive Yacht Design. The hull is built of steel and the superstructure is made of aluminium, with teak laid decks. The yacht is Lloyd's registered, issued by Cayman Islands. 

Amenities
Zero speed stabilizers, elevator, beauty room, spa, swimming platform, air conditioning, swimming pool, gym & outdoor gym, movie theatre, basketball court, and a crane to launch racing boats. 

Performance
Propulsion is supplied by twin 5,766hp MTU 20V4000 M93L diesel engines.

See also
 Luxury yacht
 List of motor yachts by length List of yachts built by Feadship''

References 

2010 ships
Motor yachts
Larry Ellison